The Silent Patient is a 2019 psychological thriller novel written by British–Cypriot author Alex Michaelides. The successful debut novel was published by Celadon Books, a division of Macmillan Publishers, on 5 February 2019. The audiobook version, released on the same date, is read by Louise Brealey and Jack Hawkins. The story is narrated by an English psychotherapist, Theo Faber, dealing with a patient who turns mute after murdering her husband. Upon its release, the book debuted on The New York Times Best Seller list at No.1. It later won the Goodreads Choice Award 2019 in the Mystery and Thriller category.

Writing
On writing his debut novel, author Michaelides, who is also a screenwriter, said, "I was feeling very disillusioned as a screenwriter. I kept seeing scripts being mangled in the production and this sense of frustration made me decide to sit down and finally write a novel." He rewrote the draft around 50 times before finalizing it. The Athenian tragedy Alcestis, by Euripides, served as an inspiration for the plot, while its narrative structure was influenced by Agatha Christie's writing.

Michaelides decided to set his novel in a psychiatric unit as he had worked at a secure psychiatric facility for teenagers while he was a psychotherapy student.

Reception
The novel received generally positive reviews from critics. The Independent lauded the book for its plot, characters and style, writing: "[the book is] vivid enough to warrant devouring it in a day ... the writing is scalpel-sharp and uncluttered, the style spare and concise, uncrowded with extraneous detail." The Guardian concurred, praising its "tight, uncluttered prose" and "skillful building [of] tension until the novel's shocking denouement". Deccan Herald called it "an intelligent plot coupled with an interesting character study, and finally the impactful punch that leaves you flabbergasted." The Washington Post praised the plot as "fresh" but criticised its "hacky horror tropes, trite scenes and comically shifty red herring characters." Another negative review came from Kirkus Reviews, who panned the book as "clumsy, contrived, and silly ... with a twist savvy readers will see coming from a mile away."

References

Novels set in London
Nonlinear narrative novels
2019 debut novels
British mystery novels
2019 British novels
Macmillan Publishers books